Yeni Taşköprü or Tinaz is a village in the Düzce District of Düzce Province in Turkey. Its population is 2,011 (2022). Mostly populated by Kurds, the village is near the Small Melen River and has a lot of grassland, where most of the cattles are brought to in the summer period.

Yeni Taşköprü has a middle school, which was renovated during the summerbreak of 2020. The village also has a cosmetics factory that employs 58 women. Most villagers and people from the nearby Bahçeköy and Paşakonağı have cattle farms.

References

Villages in Düzce District
Kurdish settlements in East Marmara Region